Lengana Nkhethoa (born 17 August 1978) is a Mosotho footballer who currently plays as a defender for Lesotho Defense Force. He has won seven caps for the Lesotho national football team since 2005.

External links
 

Association football defenders
Lesotho footballers
Lesotho international footballers
1978 births
Living people